The following is a partial list of Recorded Texas Historic Landmarks (RTHLs) arranged by county as designated by the Texas Historical Commission and local county historical commissions in Texas. This page includes RTHLs in the following counties: Grayson, Gregg, Grimes, Guadalupe, Hale, Hall, Hamilton, Hansford, Hardeman, Hardin, Harris, Harrison, Hartley, Haskell, Hays, Hemphill, Henderson, Hidalgo, Hill, Hockley, Hood, Hopkins, Houston, Howard, and Hudspeth.

KEY

Landmarks with multiple historic designations are colored according to their highest designation within the following hierarchy.

Grayson County

Gregg County

Grimes County

Guadalupe County

Hale County

Hall County

Hamilton County

Hansford County

Hardeman County

Hardin County

Harris County

Harrison County

Hartley County

Haskell County

Hays County

Hemphill County

Henderson County

Hidalgo County

Hill County

Hockley County
There are currently no Recorded Texas Historic Landmarks listed within the county.

Hood County

Hopkins County

Houston County

Howard County

Hudspeth County

See also

References

External links

 (Grayson-Hudspeth)
Landmarks (Grayson-Hudspeth)